Bedlam is an EP by Twilightning, released on 27 March 2006 on the Universal International label.

Track listing 
 "Space of Disgrace"
 "Rolling Heads"   
 "Sex Jail"
 "Plague Overload"
 "Train to Bedlam"

Personnel
Tommi Sartanen – Guitars
Ville Wallenius – Guitars
Jussi Kainulainen – Bass guitars
Juha Leskinen – Drums
Heikki Pöyhiä – Vocals
Mikko Naukkarinen – Keyboards

References

Twilightning albums
2006 EPs